Typha × gezei is a plant of hybrid origin, endemic to  France. It apparently originated as a cross between  the two very widespread species T. domingensis and T. angustifolia.  Typha × gezei grows in freshwater marshes.

References

gezei
Freshwater plants
Plant nothospecies
Endemic flora of France
Plants described in 1940